Michael Freedman (born 1951) is an American mathematician.

Michael Freedman may also refer to:

Michael Freedman (Society of the Guardians) (1929–1996), Australian mystic
Michael J. Freedman, American computer scientist
Mike Freedman, American television cameraman

See also
Michael Freeman (disambiguation)
Michael Friedman (disambiguation)
Mikhail Fridman (born 1964), Russian businessman